Irvine Byrd "Irv" Hill was a Virginia politician and broadcasting executive who served as the Mayor of the city of Norfolk from 1974 to 1976.

Early life
Hill was born in Norfolk to Madeline C. Hill and Herman R. Hill.  He attended Maury High School, graduating from there in 1945.  He then went on to attend the College of William and Mary.  He later studied management at Harvard University's School of Business.

Military career
He served in the Virginia National Guard from 1958-1962 and in the United States Navy Reserve.

Political career
He served as a member of the City Council (Sept. 1, 1972 until August 30, 1976) and then as Mayor in the City of Norfolk, Virginia from 1974-1976 where was nicknamed "The People's Mayor". In 2014, he was renominated to serve as a member of the Lake Taylor Hospital Community Board by Mayor Paul Fraim.

Business career
In addition to his community service roles, he served as a television and radio executive.  He sold commercial placements for WTAR radio. He later served as station manager for WCMS radio.  Then he worked for Cox Communications.

Personal life
He was married to Elizabeth Stewart Hill for 51 years.  He later married Marjorie Batty Dey Hill.

Awards
He was received the Distinguished Service Medal as Norfolk's First Citizen in 2000.

References

External links
Norfolk Public Library: The Mayors of Norfolk

Businesspeople from Virginia
Virginia city council members
Mayors of Norfolk, Virginia
Harvard Business School alumni
United States Navy reservists
1927 births
2015 deaths
College of William & Mary alumni
American media executives